Wat Phra Sri Mahathat Station is a BTS Skytrain station, on the Sukhumvit Line in Bangkok, Thailand. It is located in front of Wat Phra Sri Mahathat and is above Lak Si Roundabout. It is one of the few stations on the line with an island platform. The station is part of the northern extension of the Sukhumvit Line and opened on 5 June 2020, as part of phase 3.

An interchange to the MRTA Pink Line is under construction and is planned to open in February 2023.

See also 

 Bangkok Skytrain

References 

BTS Skytrain stations
Railway stations opened in 2020